The R522 is a Regional Route in South Africa.

Route
It is the more northern of two parallel east-west routes, the other being the R523. Its western origin is a point on the R521 road between Alldays and Polokwane (Pietersburg), and from there it runs to the N1 at Wyllie's Poort pass. It is cosigned for a time with the N1 in a southerly direction, before continuing east to Thohoyandou, where it ends at an intersection with the R524.

References

Regional Routes in Limpopo